Palpable purpura is a condition where purpura, which constitutes visible non-blanching hemorrhages, are raised and able to be touched or felt upon palpation. It indicates some sort of vasculitis secondary to a serious disease.

Causes
 Rocky mountain spotted fever
 Acute meningococcemia
 Disseminated gonococcal infection
 Ecthyma gangrenosum
 Henoch–Schönlein purpura
 Eosinophilic granulomatosis with polyangiitis
 Polyarteritis nodosa
 Leucocytoclastic vasculitis
 Microscopic polyangiitis
 Mixed essential cryoglobulinemia
 Subacute bacterial endocarditis

Diagnosis
Identification of underlying cause.

Treatment

Treat the underlying disease.

References

Further reading
 
 

Vascular-related cutaneous conditions